The ABC Young Performers Awards is a classical music competition for young people that ran annually from 1944 to 2015, and again from 2017.  It is generally considered the most prestigious Australian classical music competition not restricted to a single instrument.  

It was conducted by the Australian Broadcasting Corporation in conjunction with Symphony Australia (a trading name of Symphony Services Australia Limited, a non-profit arts organisation that operates both domestically and internationally).

In December 2015 it was announced that the competition would be discontinued with immediate effect, as Symphony Australia could no longer support it.  However, in October 2016 the return of the competition from 2017 was announced.  It will now be under the management of the Music & Opera Singers Trust (MOST), a philanthropic organisation.

Names
The competition had a number of names throughout its history. 
 It was founded in 1944 by the then Australian Broadcasting Commission as a set of six state-based competitions.
 In 1950 it was given the name ABC Concerto and Vocal Competition.  
 In 1968 it became known as the ABC Instrumental and Vocal competition.  
 In 1987 it was renamed the ABC Young Performers Awards. 
 In 1997 the Concerts Division of the ABC devolved to become Symphony Australia, and the competition was then known as the Symphony Australia Young Performers Awards. 
 In 2005 after a corporate restructure within Symphony Australia, the competition was rebranded as the ABC Symphony Australia Young Performers Awards.
 In 2016 after the Music & Opera Singers Trust (MOST) took carriage of the awards, the competition was rebranded as the ABC Young Performers Awards.

Format
The structure of the competition also underwent numerous changes.  Initially, there were six state-based competitions, with no overall winner.  In 1949, the six state winners competed for the Commonwealth final for the first time.  In 1950, singers and instrumentalists were separated.  In 1968 a Preliminary Recital stage was introduced and the instrumental categories were divided into Keyboard and Other.  In 1978, four categories were introduced: Vocal, Orchestral Strings, Keyboard, and Other Instrumental. 

In 1981 came an award for the  most outstanding competitor, their prize including concerts with ABC orchestras. In 1986 the State finals were converted to four category finals.

In 2002 the vocal division of the competition was disbanded and the award transferred over to the Australian Singing Competition. 

From 2013 until 2015, all entrants were exposed to Preliminary Auditions which were held in each state, from which 12 finalists were chosen by the judges irrespective of their instrument.  All 12 finalists played in a Recital round; six were chosen to proceed to the Chamber Music round; and three contested the Concerto round.  One of these three was chosen as the ABC Symphony Australia Young Performer of the Year. The chamber and concerto rounds are hosted each year by a different state orchestra of Australia, 2013's awards will be hosted by the Melbourne Symphony Orchestra.

From 2017, preliminary auditions are by digital video submission from which 12 Semi Finalists are chosen by the judges, irrespective of their instrument or location. All 12 Semi Finalists play in a series of competitive public recitals from which three Finalists are chosen to proceed to the Finals. One of the Finalists is chosen as the overall winner and is named the Young Performer of the Year.
The awards are broadcast on ABC Classic FM. 

In 2018, the recital round was held at City Recital Hall in Sydney, and the final concerto round was held at the Sydney Opera House with the Sydney Symphony Orchestra. The winner of the 2018 competition was the violinist Emily Sun.

Notable competitors
The Young Performers Awards and its predecessors featured some of the best known names in the Australian classical music scene.  They include:

 Caroline Almonte (piano; 1992)
 Adele Anthony (violin; 1984)
 Fiona Campbell (mezzo-soprano; 1994)
 Catherine Carby (soprano; 1996)
 Rebecca Chambers (piano; 1993)
 Mark Chu (piano; 2005)
 Tamara Anna Cislowska (piano; 1991)
 Jeffrey Crellin (oboe; 1973)
 Brieley Cutting (piano; 2006)
 Andrew Kawai (oboe; 2013, 2014)
 Keith Crellin (viola; 1972)
 Robert Davidovici (violin; 1967)
 Andrew Day (flute; 1996)
 Deborah de Graaff (clarinet; 1983)
 Brett Dean (viola; 1981)
 Amy Dickson (saxophone; 2004)
 Diana Doherty (oboe; 1985)
 Claire Edwardes (percussion; 1999)
 Richard Farrell (piano; 1944)
 Gustav Fenyo (piano; 1969)
 Glenys Fowles (soprano; 1967)
 David Fung (piano; 2002)
 Charmian Gadd (violin; 1962)
 Duncan Gifford (piano; 1989)
 Miriam Gormley (soprano; 1985)
 Nance Grant (soprano; 1960)
 Bernadette Harvey (piano; 1987)
 David Helfgott (piano; state finalist 6 times)
 Vernon Hill (flute; 1965)
 Caitlin Hulcup (mezzo-soprano; 2001)
 Rosamund Illing (soprano; 1976)
 Beryl Kimber (violin; 1946)
 Alison Lazaroff-Somssich (violin; 1986)
 Bernice Lehmann (piano; 1948)
 Clemens Leske (jr; piano; 1990)
 Geoffrey Douglas Madge (piano; 1963)
 Emma Matthews (soprano; 1993)
 Stephen McIntyre (piano; 1960)
 Ian Munro (piano; 1982)
 Jolanta Nagajek (mezzo-soprano; 1981)
 Mary-Jean O'Doherty (soprano; 2007)
 Max Olding (piano; 1952)
 Geoffrey Parsons (piano; 1947)
 Geoffrey Payne (trumpet; 1982)
 Li-Wei Qin (cello; 1993)
 Julie Raines (harp; 1970)
 Lachlan Redd (piano; 1996)
 Paul Rickard-Ford (piano; 1983)
 Sophie Rowell (violin; 2000)
 Victor Sangiorgio (piano; 1978)
 Julian Smiles (cello; 1988)
 Jonathan Summers (baritone; 1973)
 Simon Tedeschi (piano; 1998)
 Lloyd Van’t Hoff (clarinet; 2015)
 Alan Vivian (clarinet; 1975)
 Nathan Waks (cello; 1968)
 Neil Warren-Smith (bass-baritone; 1955)
 Donald Westlake (clarinet: 1952)
 Kristian Winther (violin; 2002)
 Roger Woodward (piano; 1964)
 Emily Sun (violin; 2018)
 Ashley William Smith (Clarinet, 2010)

References

External links
 
 Symphony Services International
 Music & Opera Singers Trust

Recurring events established in 1944
1944 establishments in Australia
2015 disestablishments in Australia
2017 establishments in Australia
Music competitions in Australia
Australian music awards
Classical music in Australia
Australian Broadcasting Corporation
Symphony Services International